Lentula is a small genus of grasshoppers native to southern Africa. It is the type genus of the family Lentulidae.

Species include:
Lentula callani Dirsh, 1956
Lentula minuta Dirsh, 1956
Lentula obtusifrons Stål, 1878
Lentula tuberculata Miller, 1932

References

Lentulidae
Orthoptera of Africa
Taxa named by Carl Stål